Girard is a French surname. Notable people with the surname include:

 Aimé Girard (1830–1898), French chemist
 Albert Girard (1595–1632), French-born mathematician (based on Netherlands)
 Alexander Girard (1907–1993), American textile designer and folk art collector
 Charles Frédéric Girard (1822–1895), French biologist
 Claire Girard, background character in Code Lyoko
  (1952–2004), French political figure
 Geoffrey Girard, American author
 Georges Girard, French bacteriologist
 Hugo Girard, Canadian Strongman, former World Champion
 Jean-Baptiste Girard (disambiguation)
  (1750–1811), Swiss general
 Jean-Yves Girard (born 1947), French mathematician and logician
 Jonathan Girard (born 1980), former Canadian ice hockey player
 Joe Girard, Guinness Book of World Records winning American salesman
 Joseph W. Girard (1871-1949), American actor
 Louis Dominique Girard (1815–1871), French hydraulic engineer
 Maurice Jean Auguste Girard (1822–1886), French entomologist
 Nicolas Girard (born 1972), Quebec politician
 Philippe de Girard (1775–1845), French inventor
 Pierre-Simon Girard (1765–1836), French mathematician
 Rémy Girard, Canadian actor
 René Girard (1923–2015), French philosopher
 René Girard (footballer), French footballer
  (1879–1956), Quebec writer
 Samuel Girard (born 1998), Canadian ice hockey player
 Serge Girard (born 1953), French adventurer
 Stephen Girard, American financier and philanthropist
  (born 1951), French photographer
 William S. Girard

French-language surnames